Woodbine Centre is a shopping mall in Toronto, Ontario, Canada. It is located at Rexdale Boulevard and Highway 27 in the Rexdale area of Toronto, across Rexdale Boulevard from Woodbine Racetrack. The mall has over 130 stores and is home to Fantasy Fair, a year-round indoor amusement park. The fair houses a Charles I. D. Looff carousel. It is one of 13 still in operation today. They also have a 50-foot ferris wheel which they say is the only one in North America.

History
Woodbine Centre was opened in 1985 by developer Cadillac Fairview, Its design served as inspiration for property developer Sir John Hall when planning the MetroCentre, the UK's largest shopping mall, in the 1980s.

In 2008, proposed development of an entertainment centre at Woodbine Racetrack and the closure of national stores like Shoppers Drug Mart fuelled rumours that the mall was closing. Instead, then-owners Darton Property planned renovations to washrooms.

As of 2016, the assessed value of the property was $96,708,000. Woodbine Mall Holdings Inc. owed over a half-million in unpaid taxes that year.

Fantasy Fair Amusement Park

Fantasy Fair is an indoor amusement park and the largest in Ontario featuring nine full-sized rides:

 1911 Antique Looff Carousel
 Crystal Kaleidoscope – indoor Ferris Wheel (50 ft.)
 Ships Ahoy – spinning tea cups
 Smash 'n Dash – bumper cars
 Fantasy Flight – A 32' Balloon Tower Ride
 Fantasy Fair Express Train – mini replica steam engine (driver sits in tender unit) with 3 open air passenger cars (each carrying 8 passengers)
 Airforce (plane ride)
 Spinner – roller coaster
 Simulator
 Climbing Wall
 Drop Tower
 Play Village (indoor playground)

In popular culture

The mall was used in the filming of 1987's "Police Academy 4: Citizens on Patrol", where David Spade is seen skateboarding through the mall.

The mall also featured in the Animorphs television adaptation's second season episode Changes, Part 2.

Various parts of the mall and Fantasy Fair also feature in 2021's 8-Bit Christmas

References

External links

 
 Fantasy Fair

Etobicoke
Shopping malls in Toronto
Shopping malls established in 1985
Amusement parks in Canada
Indoor amusement parks
Cadillac Fairview
1985 establishments in Ontario